A recluse is a person who shuns the public and society. 

Recluse or The Recluse may also refer to:
 Recluse, Wyoming, a town in the United States
 Recluse Nunatak, Alexander Island, Antarctica
 Recluse spider, a genus of venomous spiders
 Recluse butterflies of the genus Caenides
 "The Recluse" (Plan B song), a 2010 single from the British artist Plan B
 "The Recluse", a single from the 2003 album The Ugly Organ by the American band Cursive
 The Recluse, an incomplete poem by William Wordsworth of which The Excursion and The Prelude are parts

See also
 List of people known as the Recluse
 Recluse literature, a Japanese literary movement